Malmivaara is a Finnish-language surname. Notable people with the surname include:

 Arvi Malmivaara (1885–1970), Finnish Lutheran clergyman and politician
 Laura Malmivaara (born 1973), Finnish actress
 Malla Malmivaara (born 1982), Finnish actress and singer
 Olli Malmivaara (born 1982), Finnish ice hockey player
 Tatu Malmivaara (1908–1987), Finnish Lutheran clergyman and politician
 Väinö Malmivaara (1879–1958), Finnish Lutheran bishop
 Wilhelmi Malmivaara (1854–1922), Finnish Lutheran priest

Finnish-language surnames